Bad Kohlgrub is a German municipality in the district of Garmisch-Partenkirchen, in Bavaria.

A chairlift (opened 1954) south of the town leads up to the Hörnlehütte below the summit of the Hörnle mountain.

Transport

References

Garmisch-Partenkirchen (district)
Spa towns in Germany